Siop Nain is a Grade II Listed Building situated near the centre of Ruthin, Denbighshire and dates back to 1490. From 1850 Isaac Clarke used a building at the back as a print shop, which is most notable for the first printing of the National Anthem of Wales: Hen Wlad Fy Nhadau.  Around 1850 he set up his own business at 6 Well Street, Ruthin. "Siop Nain" is also known as 6 Well Street.

It has been listed "for its special architectural interest as a sub-medieval timber-framed building retaining early character and detail, with some good C17 and C19 detail. The printing of the Welsh National Anthem here is of additional historic interest. Group value with surrounding listed buildings in Well Street."

It is now a licensed restaurant and a card and gift shop selling English and Welsh language gifts and cards.

References

Grade II listed buildings in Ruthin